Julie is an LP album by Julie London, released by Liberty Records under catalog numbers LRP-3096 (monaural) in 1957 and LST-7004 (stereophonic) in 1958.

The cover by art director Charles Ward was nominated at the 1st Annual Grammy Awards for Best Album Cover but lost to Frank Sinatra Sings for Only the Lonely.

Track listing

Personnel
 Julie London - vocals
 Georgie Auld - tenor saxophone
 Benny Carter - alto saxophone
 Pete Candoli - trumpet
 Jack Sheldon - trumpet
 Buddy Collette - reeds
 Bud Shank - reeds
 Jimmy Rowles - piano, arranger
 Al Hendrickson - guitar
 Ray Leatherwood - bass
 Ted Keep - engineer
 Bobby Troup - producer

Notes

References

Owen, Michael (2017). Go Slow: The Life of Julie London. Chicago Review Press.

Liberty Records albums
1957 albums
Julie London albums
Albums produced by Bobby Troup